Melanocinclis lineigera is a moth in the family Cosmopterigidae. It is found in North America, where it has been recorded from New Jersey to Florida, Arkansas, Louisiana and Texas.

The wingspan is 6–7 mm. Adults have been recorded on wing from February to October.

The larvae feed on Pinus taeda and Pinus elliottii. They feed on the cones of their host plant.

References

Natural History Museum Lepidoptera generic names catalog

Cosmopteriginae